Taicheng Subdistrict is a subdistrict which serves as the capital of the county-level city of Taishan, Jiangmen, Guangdong Province, China. The subdistrict lies on the right bank of the Pearl River Delta in Guangdong.

History

The area of present-day Taicheng Subdistrict has been continuously incorporated since 1499, when the area was incorporated as Xinning City.

In 1891, the Presbyterian Church of America constructed a chapel on the main thoroughfare of Tai Xi Road, which was reconstructed in elegant red-brick in 1922 with a capacity of 300.

In 1906, under the oversight of Chin Gee Hee, the Sun Ning Railway Company began building a railway to connect Sunning (Xinning) County to its northern and southern neighbors. On March 1, 1909, the Sunning Railway Station was opened in what is now the subdistrict. The rail line, which was completed in 1920, drew attention both domestically and internationally for being the first Chinese-funded and Chinese-constructed railroad in the world.

In 1907, the Tan Clan Middle School was founded east of the town, but is now surrounded by urban development. A new residential school is being constructed outside of the town to replace what is now a dilapidated and crowded structure.

In 1938, Xinning was designated the administrative center of Xinning County. The same year, the area's railway was ordered by the Nationalist Government to be destroyed to prevent the advance of invading Japanese troops. The Xinning Railway Station would subsequently be repurposed as a bus station.

On March 3, 1941, Japanese troops from Doushan marched into Taicheng led by a Chinese traitor, and took the town in three hours. 282 people were killed, 534 stores and houses were burnt, and goods estimated at ¥3,600,000 were plundered. A week later the Nationalist Chinese Army retook the town, but were again forced out on September 20, 1941. Japanese troops remained in occupation until their unconditional surrender at the end of the war on August 15, 1945.

In 1949 more than 30,000 people gathered in Taishan Park to celebrate the Communist victory in the civil war against the armies of the Kuomintang (KMT) of Chiang Kai-shek. Upon the establishment of the People's Republic of China, Xinning City was renamed as Taicheng Town.

From 1958 to 1983, Taicheng was re-designated as a people's commune.

On August 11, 2006, Taicheng was upgraded from a town to a subdistrict.

Railway service within the subdistrict restarted in 2018 with the construction of the Taishan railway station within the village of Nankeng. The railway station was designed to replicate the original design of the Xinning Railway Station. The station lies on the Shenzhen–Zhanjiang high-speed railway.

Geography
The subdistrict covers 157.6 km² with a population of 175,321 as of 2008. Taicheng is bordered to its east by the town of Sijiu, by the town of Baisha to its west, the towns of Sanhe and Chonglou to its south, and the town of Shuibu to its north.

With the urban center covering only some 18 km², there are 27000 mu under cultivation. Some of the subdistrict's villages are surrounded by high-rise urban development, while others lie in the rural outskirts of the township, including the village of Bihou.

Administrative divisions 
Taicheng Subdistrict administers 11 residential communities and 26 administrative villages.

The subdistrict's 11 residential communities are Fucheng Residential Community, Dongyun Residential Community, Huannan Residential Community, Nantang Residential Community, Xinqiao Residential Community, Yuantian Residential Community, Shanglang Residential Community, Hexin Residential Community, Qiaohu Residential Community, Cangxia Residential Community, and Fenghuang Residential Community.

The subdistrict's 26 administrative villages are Shakeng Village, Beikeng Village, Dongkeng Village, Bangang Village, Hebei Village, Nankeng Village, Shihua Village, Anbu Village, Daheng Village, Changling Village, Xiangyanhu Village, Chanxi Village, Henghu Village, Libian Village, Jinkeng Village, Paobu Village, Shuinan Village, Zhudong Village, Pinggang Village, Lingbei Village, Luodong Village, Dancun Village, Yuanshan Village, Baishui Village, Guishui Village, and Sanshe Village.

References

External links
http://www.taishan.com/english/towns/taicheng/index.htm
http://www.tsinfo.com.cn/EN

Taishan, Guangdong
Township-level divisions of Guangdong
Subdistricts of the People's Republic of China